Honeydew Studios is a small animation production company in Brisbane, Australia. It was named after a short-lived, Muppet-inspired nickname for its founder. It produced the multi award-winning animated short film Gus, and is in production of its latest animated short film Levare.

See also

List of film production companies
List of television production companies

References

External links

Australian animation studios